Rodrigo Elías Delvalle Noguera (born 17 May 2001) is a Paraguayan professional footballer who plays as a defender for Paraguayan Primera División side Cerro Porteño.

Club career
Delvalle began his career with Paraguayan Primera División side Cerro Porteño and made his professional debut on 15 December 2019 against General Díaz. He started the match as Cerro Porteño were defeated 2–4.

Career statistics

Club

References

2001 births
Living people
Paraguayan footballers
Association football defenders
Cerro Porteño players
Paraguayan Primera División players